is a railway station on the Tokyu Tamagawa Line in Ōta, Tokyo, Japan, operated by Tokyu Corporation.

Station layout
The station consists of two ground-level side platforms.

Platforms

History
It was renamed Musashi-Nitta in June 1924.

References

Railway stations in Tokyo
Railway stations in Japan opened in 1923
Tokyu Tamagawa Line
Stations of Tokyu Corporation